A Man Escaped or The Wind Bloweth Where It Listeth (which literally translates as: "A man condemned to death has escaped or The wind blows where it wants"; the subtitle is a quote from ) is a 1956 French prison escape film directed by Robert Bresson. It is based on a memoir by André Devigny, a member of the French Resistance who was held in Montluc prison during World War II by the occupying Germans, though the protagonist of the film was given a different name.

The film was screened in competition at the 1957 Cannes Film Festival, and it has been one of Bresson's most renowned works since its initial release.

Plot
In Lyon in 1943, Fontaine, a member of the French Resistance, jumps out of the car that is taking him to Montluc prison. He is immediately apprehended, and his German captors handcuff him, beat him, and lock him up. Throughout his time in prison, Fontaine regularly hears gunfire as other inmates are executed.

At first, Fontaine is placed in a cell on the ground floor of Montluc. He communicates with his neighbor by tapping on the wall and is regularly able to talk to Terry, a member of a small group that is allowed to exercise in a courtyard unsupervised, from his window. Terry takes Fontaine's letters to his family and superiors in the Resistance and gets him a safety pin so he can remove his handcuffs.

After fifteen days, Fontaine is moved to a cell on the top floor of Montluc, and he is no longer made to wear handcuffs. His new neighbor, Blanchet, is an elderly man who refuses to respond to his taps on the wall, but he gets to know several other inmates on his daily trips to empty his slop bucket and wash his face, even though the guards regularly admonish them for talking. After Blanchet faints while emptying his slop bucket, he and Fontaine begin to talk to each other at their windows.

Fontaine notices the wooden door of his cell is made up of thick boards joined together by a softer wood, so he sharpens the end of a spoon and begins to chisel away at the joints. After weeks of slow, silent, meticulous work, which involves keeping track of and disposing of every wood shaving and figuring out how to camouflage the damage he is doing to the door, he is able to get out of his cell into the hallway at will. He then makes some rope using most of his linens and the wire from his bed frame.

Some of Fontaine's fellow inmates begin to believe he may actually be able to figure out a way to escape from Montluc, and Orsini, who helped alert Fontaine to approaching guards while he was chiseling at his door, asks to come along. Fontaine shares his plan with Orsini, but Orsini thinks it is too complicated and instead tries to make a run for it one day as the inmates walk to empty their slop buckets. He is caught and returned to his cell while the plans are made for his execution, and he tells Fontaine to fashion hooks to scale the prison walls from the frame of the lighting fixture in his cell.

Fontaine makes more rope out of some cloth items he receives in a package, and Blanchet even donates a blanket to his escape effort. As time goes on, however, the other inmates begin to doubt Fontaine will ever really try to escape, and another prisoner refuses to join his plan, calling it unrealistic.

Shortly after learning he has been sentenced to death, Fontaine is given a cellmate. The young soldier, François Jost, says he has been convicted of desertion, but Fontaine suspects he may have been planted by the Nazis to get information. Fontaine spends some time feeling Jost out and ultimately decides to trust the boy and escape with him, knowing he would have to be killed otherwise.

One day, Fontaine says his goodbyes and tells Jost his plan. Jost understands he does not really have a choice, so he gets on board and helps make some more rope. The pair go into the hallway that night and reach the roof via a skylight. Fontaine slowly leads the way across the roof, taking advantage of the auditory cover provided by passing trains, and descends into a courtyard, where he kills a German guard. He and Jost climb a building and hook a rope across the gap between the inner and outer walls of the prison compound, but Fontaine loses his nerve and just sits there. Several hours later, he finally shimmies across the rope and drops down into the streets of Lyon, and he and Jost walk away from Montluc undetected.

Cast

François Leterrier as Lieutenant Fontaine
Charles Le Clainche as François Jost
Maurice Beerblock as Blanchet
Roland Monod as Pastor Deleyris
Jacques Ertaud as Orsini
Jean-Paul Delhumeau as Hebrard
Roger Treherne as Terry
Jean-Philippe Delamarre as Prisoner 110
César Gattegno as Prisoner X
Jacques Oerlemans as the head guard
Klaus Detlef Grevenhorst as the Abwehr officer
Leonhard Schmidt as the escort guard

Production
The film is based on the memoirs of André Devigny, a member of the French Resistance who escaped from Montluc prison in Lyon in 1943. Bresson had also been held by the Germans during WWII, though as a prisoner of war.

In an interview, Bresson said that, with A Man Escaped, he "wanted to achieve a great purity, a greater asceticism than in Diary of a Country Priest", noting his use of nonprofessional actors. The music that appears several times in the film is the Kyrie from Mozart's Great Mass in C minor, K. 427.

Reception and legacy
Bresson won Best Director at the 1957 Cannes Film Festival, and the film was named by the National Board of Review as one of the best foreign films of 1956. Today, the work is sometimes considered Bresson's masterpiece, and it came 69th in the 2012 Sight & Sound critics' poll. Roger Ebert wrote: "Watching a film like A Man Escaped is like a lesson in the cinema. It teaches by demonstration all the sorts of things that are not necessary in a movie. By implication, it suggests most of the things we're accustomed to are superfluous. I can't think of a single unnecessary shot in A Man Escaped."

Polish filmmaker Krzysztof Kieslowski was influenced by the film and ranked it as one of the top ten films that "affected" him the most. British-American filmmaker Christopher Nolan was influenced by the film (along with Pickpocket) when making Dunkirk (2017). Benny Safdie of the Safdie Brothers named the film as his favorite of all time. American-British singer Scott Walker also listed the film as one of his all-time favorites.

Home video releases
New Yorker Video released the film on Region 1 DVD in 2004 (this release is currently out of print). Artificial Eye put out a Region 2 release in the UK in April 2008, which contains a superior audio/video presentation and features the 1984 Dutch documentary The Road to Bresson as an extra. Madman Entertainment released a Region 4 Australian DVD in July 2009, which contains a scholarly audio commentary by Professor Ross Gibson of the Sydney College of the Arts, University of Sydney.

Gaumont released the film on Blu-ray in France in November 2010.

The film was released by The Criterion Collection in March 2013 on Region A Blu-ray and Region 1 DVD. Supplementary features included with this release include "Bresson: Without a Trace", the 1965 episode of the French television program Cinéastes de notre temps that features the director's first on-camera interview; The Road to Bresson, which features interviews with filmmakers Andrei Tarkovsky, Louis Malle, and Paul Schrader; The Essence of Forms, a 2010 French documentary in which collaborators and admirers of Bresson, including actor François Leterrier and director Bruno Dumont, share their thoughts about the director and his work; and "Functions of Film Sound", a visual essay on the use of sound in A Man Escaped, which features narration taken from a chapter about the film in Film Art: An Introduction by film scholars David Bordwell and Kristin Thompson.

References

Bibliography

External links
 
 
A Man Escaped: Quintessential Bresson an essay by Tony Pipolo at the Criterion Collection

1956 films
1950s war drama films
French prison films
French black-and-white films
French war drama films
1950s French-language films
Existentialist films
French docudrama films
Films about the French Resistance
Films directed by Robert Bresson
Films set in Lyon
World War II films based on actual events
World War II prisoner of war films
1956 drama films
Drama films based on actual events
1950s French films